The Halifax Farmers' Market is the oldest continuously operating farmer's market in North America having been founded in 1750. Over the years the market has been held in many locations around Halifax, Nova Scotia, including Keith's Brewery Building on 1496 Lower Water Street.

In 2010 the majority of the cooperative members of the market moved to a new building which is part of the Halifax Seaport and took on the name 'Halifax Seaport Farmers' Market'. A small number of vendors chose to remain in the old location and rebranded themselves as the 'Historic Farmers Market'. The Seaport market celebrated 265 years in October of 2015. 

The new Seaport Farmers Market building was designed by local architecture firm Lydon Lynch. It is LEED Gold certified. Located in a converted warehouse, the building incorporates energy- and water-saving measures as well as a green roof that is open as a publicly accessible rooftop garden.

References

External links
 
 Halifax Farmers' Market - official site
 Historic Farmers Market - official site

Buildings and structures in Halifax, Nova Scotia
Farmers' markets in Canada
Culture of Halifax, Nova Scotia
Tourist attractions in Halifax County, Nova Scotia
Food and drink in Nova Scotia